Streptomyces tunisiensis is a bacterium species from the genus of Streptomyces which has been isolated from forest soil in Tunis in Tunisia. Streptomyces tunisiensis has antibacterial activity.

See also 
 List of Streptomyces species

References

Further reading

External links
Type strain of Streptomyces tunisiensis at BacDive -  the Bacterial Diversity Metadatabase	

tunisiensis
Bacteria described in 2014